Garfield Mahood is a Canadian non-smokers' rights activist.  He was the long-time Executive Director of the Non-Smokers' Rights Association (NSRA) and its sister charity, the Smoking and Health Action Foundation (SHAF), since soon after their creation in 1974.

Awards
In 1997, Mahood received the Canadian Cancer Society's R.M. Taylor Medal and Award, their highest award. In 2007, Garfield Mahood received the Order of Canada for his life's work in tobacco control.

References

External links
 Non-Smokers' Rights Association (NSRA) - past employer

Canadian activists
Members of the Order of Canada
Living people
Year of birth missing (living people)